The 2017 Crescent Women World Cup Vårgårda Team time trial featured as the tenth round of the 2017 UCI Women's World Tour. It was held on 11 August 2017, in Vårgårda, Sweden.

Results

References

Open de Suède Vårgårda
Crescent Vargarda
Crescent Vargarda
Crescent Vargarda